Pimenta adenoclada is a species of plant in the family Myrtaceae (Myrtle).  It is endemic to Cuba.  It is threatened by habitat loss.

References

adenoclada
Flora of Cuba
Vulnerable plants
Taxonomy articles created by Polbot